Nervous Like Me is the debut studio album by American rock band Cayetana, released in 2014.

Track listing

Critical reception
Nervous Like Me was released to positive reviews. Philip Cosores of Consequence of Sound gave the album a B+ rating and praised the album as one of the best debut albums from a Philadelphia band.

References

2014 albums
Tiny Engines albums